Cabo rojo, Spanish for "red cape", may refer to:

 Cabo Rojo, Dominican Republic, in Pedernales Province
 Cabo Rojo (Mexico), a coastal feature in the state of Veracruz
 Cabo Rojo, Puerto Rico, a municipality
 Cabo Rojo National Natural Landmark, a National Natural Landmark in Puerto Rico
 Cabo Rojo National Wildlife Refuge, Puerto Rico